Over the course of the 19th and 20th centuries, several reservoirs and dams were built in the area now covered by Dartmoor National Park in Devon, England to supply drinking water to the rapidly growing towns in the surrounding lowlands. With its deep valleys and high rainfall, Dartmoor was an inevitable location. New reservoirs continued construction even after the establishment of the National Park in 1951.

Early schemes to use the moors as a source of drinking water involved the construction of water channels called leats. For example, Drake's Leat (completed 1591) took water to Plymouth and the Devonport Leat (1793) to the docks at Devonport. Rapid population growth of the seaside communities in the late 19th century and the birth of tourism required a significant improvement in quality and quantity of fresh water.

The first Dartmoor reservoir (Tottiford) opened in 1861 and heralded a busy era of dam construction which continued through to 1907, by which time the Dartmoor area was the site of five reservoirs. Three more were to follow during the course of the mid to late 20th century. A fourth, in the valley of the River Swincombe was rejected by the advisory committee of the County Council.

A few long-established Dartmoor farms had to be abandoned and disappeared under the water as a result. During years of drought, some ruins can once again become visible. At Fernworthy, for example, low water levels often reveal the remains of Fernworthy Farm and a small granite Clapper bridge which once crossed the South Teign River.  At Avon dam, hut circles are visible at very low water levels. In 2011 an episode of Time Team was devoted to archaeological features discovered in the bed of Tottiford Reservoir.

References

External links

Reservoirs
Dartmoor
United Kingdom
Lists of buildings and structures in England